Pallavaram Friday Market (Popularly Known as Pallavaram Sandhai) is a market in Pallavaram, Chennai, Tamil Nadu. It is an ancient marketplace for vendors where food items, plant saplings, animals and electronic goods are available.

The market had its origin in 1800. The market is open only on Fridays, and is known locally as the Friday Market.

The Friday market is located closer to Pallavaram Railway Station, Pallavaram Bus Stand and Chennai International Airport.

History 
Pallavaram Sandhai was originally existed in Cattle Shandy Road (or) Sandhai Road (Currently Known as Acharya Tulsi Road) in Cantonment Pallavaram. Later the market was moved to Old Trunk Road near Pallavaram Railway Station Flyover.

References 

Retail markets in Chennai